Wolfie Kodesh (April 6, 1918 – October 18, 2002) was a South African Communist party activist.  Kodesh was born in the Transvaal mining town of Benoni. He became involved with the South African Communist party in 1938, selling the leftwing newspaper, the Guardian.

Early life
Wolfie Kodesh's paternal grandparents arrived in South Africa after fleeing the pogroms in Eastern Europe. His mother, Fanny Shapiro, came from East End in London. His
father ran a hansom cab business which collapsed during the great depression of the 1930s. After his parents separated, Wolfie, his twin sister and brother moved to Cape Town where they joined their mother.

References

1918 births
2002 deaths
Members of the South African Communist Party
Members of the Order of Luthuli